Thunnai ezhuthu is a collection of Tamil essays by S. Ramakrishnan.

S. Ramakrishnan is one of the most famous authors of the modern Tamil literature. A fiction writer, an essayist, a playwright, a movie critic and a world cinema expert. He wrote four novels, five short story collections, nine collections of essays and three books on films. Ramakrishnan was born in 1966 in Mallankinar, a small village zone of Virudhunagar district in Tamil Nadu. He took his Masters in Literature from the Madurai Kamaraj University. Some of his plays were selected for the national theatre festivals.

His most famous novel Upa Paandavam was based on the Mahabharatham epic. Nedumkuruthi, his second novel was selected as the best Tamil novel of the year 2003. His Thunai ezhuthu is a notable collection of Tamil essays. 

Work of S. Ramakrishnan is in various dimensions. He wrote the dialogues for many films, he translated several works from English and Malayalam to Tamil and many of his works got translated into English, Malayalam, Kannda, Telugu, Bengali and French. His latest novel Yaamam was well received by the modern circles of Tamil literature. Traveling is not simply a pastime but a passion for him. He is 42 years now and lives in Chennai with his wife Chandrapraba and two sons.

Awards
Best Tamil book - Tamil Nadu State Govt. award
Best Novel in Tamil - Ganavani award
Best Short story collection - Ilakkiya Sindhanai award
Best Short story collection - Lilly Devasigamani award
Best Novel - Tamil Nadu progressive writers Association
Regional award for best play - Sankeeth Natak

Indian literature